Events from the year 1746 in Ireland.

Incumbent
Monarch: George II

Events
19 March – an act of the Parliament of Great Britain prohibits the export of glass from Ireland.
26 March – King George II of Great Britain grants the Dublin Society £500 pa from the Privy Purse.
11 April – acts:
"for licensing hawkers and pedlars and for the encouragement of English Protestant schools" provides grants for charter schools.
preventing Irish subjects in the service of France or Spain from holding property.
to annul future marriages celebrated by Roman Catholic priests if either (or both) of the parties are Protestant.
June – English preacher John Cennick arrives in Ireland to evangelise for the Moravian Church.
8 August – charter for St Patrick's Hospital for Imbeciles to be established  in Dublin under the will of Jonathan Swift (died 1745).
Charles Smith's The Ancient and Present state of Waterford is published in Dublin.

Arts and literature
The National College of Art and Design originates as a private drawing school set up by the painter Robert West in Dublin.

Births
3 July – Henry Grattan, member of Irish House of Commons and campaigner for legislative freedom for the Irish Parliament (died 1820).
Thomas Hussey, diplomat, chaplain, and Bishop of the Roman Catholic Diocese of Waterford and Lismore (died 1803).

Deaths
22 May – Thomas Southerne, dramatist (born 1660).
8 August – Francis Hutcheson, theologian and philosopher (born 1694).

References

 
Years of the 18th century in Ireland
Ireland
1740s in Ireland